Norma Baraldi Briseño (born 20 July 1954) is a Mexican diver. She competed in two events at the 1976 Summer Olympics.

References

External links

1954 births
Living people
Mexican female divers
Olympic divers of Mexico
Divers at the 1976 Summer Olympics
Pan American Games competitors for Mexico
Divers at the 1971 Pan American Games
Divers at the 1975 Pan American Games
Place of birth missing (living people)